Waltz & Reece Cut is the deepest cut on the Lackawanna Cut-Off railroad line in northwest New Jersey.

Located between mileposts 48.3 and 49.0 in Byram Township, it sits on a tangent (straight) section of right-of-way just west of McMickle Cut and just east of Bradbury Fill.

It was built between 1908 and 1911 by Waltz & Reece Construction Company, which removed 822,400 cubic yards of fill material by blasting with dynamite or other methods.  The line was abandoned in 1983.

In 2012, a single track was relaid through the cut as part of NJ Transit's plans to restart rail service no earlier than 2021.

References 

Lackawanna Cut-Off